Fernando Enrique Rivas Inostroza (born 25 March 1964) is a Chilean journalist.

Biography
He was born on 25 March 1964 in Santiago, the capital of Chile. He completed his high school education at the Instituto Nacional General José Miguel Carrera in 1979.

In 1980, Rivas entered the University of Chile School of Journalism, where he graduated in 1985. Then, he completed a master's degree in history at the Pontificia Universidad Católica de Valparaíso, which he completed in 2001. In 2003, meanwhile, he completed a diploma in foreign affairs at the University of Viña del Mar (UVM). In 2014, he obtained a PhD in history at his alma mater.

In 1985, he began his career as a journalist at Estrella del Mar radio in Ancud, where he worked for two years. From 1987 to 2003, he worked for El Mercurio de Valparaíso, where he served as editor and head of several sections (including the Internet department).
In 2000, he was professor of writing and journalistic technique at the University of La Serena.

First, Rivas taught radio lessons at the UVM (1994−1997). Then, from 2000 to 2003, he had chair of courses like Introduction to Journalism or Interview and Writing Workshops. By the other hand, in 1995, he joined the Pontificia Universidad Católica de Valparaíso School of Journalism, where he was director in the 2010s and has been a full-time professor since 2004.

From 2015 to 2018, he was alternate director of the Latin American Federation of Social Communication Faculties (FELAFACS), Southern Cone Region.

References

External link
 PUCV Profile

1964 births
Living people
Chilean journalists
Instituto Nacional General José Miguel Carrera alumni
University of Chile alumni
Pontifical Catholic University of Valparaíso alumni
Academic staff of the Pontifical Catholic University of Valparaíso
Viña del Mar University alumni
People from Santiago
People from Valparaíso